USS Elkhart (APA-80) was a Gilliam-class attack transport that served with the United States Navy from 1944 to 1945. She was scrapped in 1964.

History
Elkhart was named after a county in Indiana. She was launched 5 December 1944 by Consolidated Steel at Wilmington, Los Angeles, under a Maritime Commission contract; transferred to the Navy 7 February 1945; and commissioned the following day.

World War II
Sailing from San Diego 3 April 1945, Elkhart during her brief war service carried cargo in or out of Eniwetok, Ulithi, Leyte, Peleliu, Guam, and Okinawa. In July she supported the occupation of Kume Shima in Okinawa Gunto.

After hostilities

With the end of hostilities, she made one trip to Tokyo Bay to deliver occupation cargo, then transported 6th Marine Division from Guam to reoccupy Tsingtao, China. Arriving at Haiphong in November, she embarked Chinese troops for transportation to Chinwangtao, then continued on to Jinsen (Inchon) to embark servicemen eligible for discharge upon return home. They reached the Golden Gate 3 January 1946.

Decommissioning
Elkhart was decommissioned at Seattle 12 April and returned to the Maritime Commission 28 June 1946. She was finally scrapped in 1964.

References

APA-80 Elkhart, Navsource Online.

Gilliam-class attack transports
Transports of the United States Navy
World War II auxiliary ships of the United States
World War II amphibious warfare vessels of the United States
Elkhart County, Indiana
Ships built in Los Angeles
1944 ships